Topçu may refer to:

 Topçu (corps), the artillery corps of the Ottoman army in the 15th–19th centuries
 Topçu (name)
 Topçu, Bayramören
 Topçu, Ismailli, a village and municipality in the Ismailli Rayon of Azerbaijan
 Topçu, Köprüköy
 Topçu, Tarsus, a village in the Tarsus district of Mersin Province, Turkey

See also 
 Topchi (disambiguation)